Follett Products LLC is a subsidiary of Middleby Corporation that manufactures nugget ice makers for the healthcare, foodservice, hospitality, and supermarket industries as well as refrigerators for the medical industry. Headquartered in Easton, Pennsylvania, the company operates three manufacturing facilities in Easton, Bethlehem, Pennsylvania, and Gdańsk, Poland.

In 1948, following World War II, Roy Follett saw an opportunity to fill a need in ice storage. He founded Follett Corporation to "supply ice storage bins to meet the needs of the exploding foodservice industry," according to Thomas R. Cutler.

Follett milestones include:

 1948 - Founded by Roy Follett in Garden City, New York
 1954 - Don Follett took over the company
 1967 - A new manufacturing plant opened in Easton, Pennsylvania
 1994 - Steve Follett, Roy Follet's grandson, assumed the CEO role
 2005 - A new manufacturing facility opens in Gdańsk, Poland
 2015 - A new manufacturing facility opens in Bethlehem, Pennsylvania
 2016 - Follett Corporation is acquired by The Middleby Corporation and becomes Follett LLC, an independent operating company of Middleby
 2019 - Steve Follett retires. He is succeeded by Korey Kohl, Middleby Group President overseeing the Middleby Beverage Group

Today, Follett LLC still builds ice storage and transport systems, ice and water dispensers, ice and beverage dispensers, and medical-grade refrigerators and freezers for foodservice and healthcare markets.  Follett products can be found in hospitals, restaurants, Major League Baseball stadiums and casinos around the country, and in the 2022 Winter Olympics in Beijing.

See also
 List of ice companies

References

 QSR Magazine
 Food Management
 

Companies based in Northampton County, Pennsylvania
Ice companies
American companies established in 1948
1948 establishments in New York (state)
Privately held companies based in Pennsylvania